The Mixed team aerials competition at the FIS Freestyle Ski and Snowboarding World Championships 2019 was held on February 7, 2019.

Results
The final was started at 19:00.

References

Mixed team aerials